Itabashi is a Japanese surname. Notable people with the surname include:

, Japanese jazz pianist and composer
, Japanese Zen Buddhist
, Japanese volleyball player
, Japanese ice hockey player

Japanese-language surnames